George Noyes may refer to:

 George R. Noyes (1798–1868), Unitarian minister and scholar at Harvard
 George Lorenzo Noyes (1863–1945), American mineralogist, naturalist, development critic, writer and landscape artist
 George Loftus Noyes (1864–1954), Canadian born artist known as an American Impressionist
 George Rapall Noyes (Slavic scholar) (1873–1952), professor at Berkeley, University of California